The 2010–11 season of the Slovak First League (also known as 1. liga) was the eighteenth season of the second-tier football league in Slovakia, since its establishment in 1993. It began in late July 2010 and ended in May 2011.
From the next season was this league renamed to Slovak Second Football League (2. liga).

Team changes from 2009–10
Promoted in Corgoň Liga: ↑Zlaté Moravce↑
Relegated from Corgoň Liga: ↓Petržalka↓
Promoted in 1. liga: ↑Senec↑, ↑Moldava nad Bodvou↑
Relegated from 1. liga: ↓Prievidza×↓, ↓Podbrezová×↓
× - withdrew from league

Stadia and locations

League table

Top goalscorers
Updated through games played on 28 May 2011; Source: 

31 goals
 David Depetris (AS Trenčín)

17 goals
 Filip Serečin (MFK Zemplín Michalovce)

15 goals
 Tomáš Chovanec   (MFK Ružomberok B)

14 goals
 Radoslav Augustín   (FC Petržalka 1898)
 Tomáš Gavlák  (FK Bodva)

13 goals
 Ladislav Belkovics      (ŠK SFM Senec)

12 goals
 Richard Chorvatovič   (ŠK SFM Senec)

11 goals
 Fanendo Adi     (AS Trenčín)

10 goals
 Milan Bezák   (Tatran Liptovský Mikuláš)

9 goals
 Dominik Kunca   (MFK Zemplín Michalovce)
 Ján Jurky   (MFK Dolný Kubín)

8 goals
 Miroslav Latiak   (Tatran Liptovský Mikuláš)
 Jozef Pisár   (MŠK Rimavská Sobota)

7 goals
 Ákos Szarka   (FC Petržalka 1898)
 Andrej Lovás   (MFK Ružomberok B)

See also
2010–11 Slovak Superliga
2010–11 Slovak Second League

References

External links
 Slovak FA official site 

2. Liga (Slovakia) seasons
2
Slovak